Alicia Gaspar de Alba is an American scholar, cultural critic, novelist, and poet whose works include historical novels and scholarly studies on Chicana/o art, culture and sexuality.

Biography
Gaspar de Alba was born on July 29, 1958 in El Paso, Texas near its border with Ciudad Juárez. She received a bachelor's in 1980 and a master's in 1983 in English from the University of Texas at El Paso, and a Ph.D. in American Studies in 1994 from the University of New Mexico. She teaches classes on border consciousness, bilingual creative writing, Chicana Lesbian literature, barrio popular culture, and graduate courses on Chicana theory.

In 1994, she was one of six founding faculty members of the then César Chávez Center for Interdisciplinary Instruction in Chicana and Chicano Studies at University of California, Los Angeles. Gaspar de Alba served as chair of that department from 2007-2010 and worked to approve and implement the second Ph.D. program in Chicana/o Studies at UCLA. Since 2013, Gaspar de Alba has been chairing the LGBTQ Studies Department at UCLA, where she is also working on a proposal for the first Ph.D. program in LGBTQ Studies in the nation.

Gaspar de Albas's historical novel Sor Juana's Second Dream (1999) won the Latino Literary Hall of Fame Award for Best Historical Novel in 2000. In 2001, it was translated into Spanish and published as El Segundo Sueño by Grijalbo Mondadori. The novel has also been adapted to a stage play, The Nun and the Countess by Odalys Nanin. Juana, an opera based on the novel, was performed by Opera UCLA in November 2019, the music composed by Carla Lucero and the libretto co-written by Lucero and Gaspar de Alba.

Gaspar de Alba's novels, stories, and poetry have won several literary awards. Her doctoral dissertation "Mi Casa Es Su Casa: The Cultural Politics of Chicano Art" won the 1994 Ralph Henry Gabriel American Studies Association Award. Her work has been published in several languages and focuses primarily on gender and sexuality. Her 2005 novel Desert Blood: The Juárez Murders won the Lambda Literary Award for Best Lesbian Mystery Novel and the Latino Book Award for Best Mystery Novel. This novel is based on the female homicides in Ciudad Juárez, around which Gaspar de Alba researched and organized a conference. The mystery is based on the unresolved murders of over five-hundred Mexican women and girls along the border in El Paso, Texas, the region where Gaspar de Alba is originally from. In the book, a Mexican Maquiladora worker is found dead with her disembodied baby. Another character in the novel, Ivon, a lesbian professor in Los Angeles who was supposed to adopt the baby, becomes outraged at the growing violence against women at the border. She also becomes suspicious of the border patrol's role in the violence and of the similarities between the growing number of cases. The novel points out the injustices of the treatment of Mexican Immigrants/Mexican-Americans, the corruption of the government institutions on both sides of the border, femicide, and more.

Awards

AAHE Book Award for [Un]Framing the "Bad Woman" (2015)
International Latino Book Award for Spanish Translation of Desert Blood, Sangre en el desierto (trans. Rosario Sanmiguel) (2009)
Gold Shield Faculty Prize for Academic Excellence (UCLA) 2008
Lambda Literary Award for Best Lesbian Mystery for Desert Blood (2005)
International Latino Book Award for Best English-Language Mystery for Desert Blood (2005)
Latino Literary Hall of Fame for Best Historical Fiction for Sor Juana's Second Dream (2000)
Border-Ford/Pellicer-Frost Award for Poetry (1998)
Shirley Collier Prize for Literature (UCLA) (1998)
Premio Aztlán Literary Prize for The Mystery of Survival and Other Stories (1994)
Massachusetts Artists' Foundation Fellowship Award in Poetry (1989)

Works
Crimes of the Tongue: Essays and Stories. (Arte Público Press, 2023).
 The Curse of the Gypsy: Ten Stories and a Novella (Arte Público Press, 2018).
 [Un]framing the "Bad Woman": Sor Juana, Malinche, Coyolxauhqui, and Other Rebels with a Cause. Austin, TX: U of Texas Press, 2014.
Our Lady of Controversy: Alma Lopez's "Irreverent Apparition" (co-edited with Alma Lopez) (University of Texas Press 2011)
Making a Killing: Femicide, Free Trade, and La Frontera (editor) (University of Texas Press 2010)
Calligraphy of the Witch (Saint Martin's Press 2007)
Desert Blood: The Juarez Murders (Arte Publico Press 2005)
La Llorona on the Longfellow Bridge: Poetry y Otras Movidas (Arte Publico Press 2003)
Velvet Barrios: Popular Culture and Chicana/o Sexualities (editor) (Palgrave/Macmillan 2003)
Sor Juana's Second Dream (University of New Mexico Press 1999)
Chicano Art Inside/Outside the Master's House (University of Texas Press1998)
"La Frontera," "Domingo Means Scrubbing," and "Beggar on the Cordoba Bridge. " Floricanto Si!: A Collection of Latina Poetry. Eds. Bryce Milligan, Mary Guerrero Milligan, and Angela De Hoyos. New York: Penguin Books, 1998. 135-138.
"The Politics of Location of the Tenth Muse of America: An Interview with Sor Juana Ines de la Cruz." In Living Chicana Theory. Ed. Carla Trujillo. Berkeley, California: Third Women Press, c 1998. 136-166.
"After 21 Years, a Postcard?" and "Bamba Basilica." In The floating Borderlands; Twenty-five Years of U.S. Hispanic Literature. Ed. Lauro Flores. Seattle: University of Washington Press, c1998. 235-237.
"Born in East L.A. : An Exercise in Cultural Schizophrenia." The Latino/a Condition: A Critical Reader. Eds. Richard Delgado and Jean Stefancic. New York: New York University Press, c1998. 226-230.
"The Alter-Native Grain: Theorizing Chicano/a Popular Culture." Cultures and Differences: Critical Perspectives on the Bicultural Experience in the United States. Ed. Antonia Darder. Westport, Conn. : Bergin and Garvey, 1995. 103-123.
"Malinche's Rights." Currents from the Dancing River: Contemporary Latino Fiction, Nonfiction, and Poetry. Ed. Ray Gonzalez. New York: Harcourt Brace, c1994. 261-267.
"Malinchista, A Myth Revised," "Literary Wetback," and "Making Tortillas." Infinite Divisions: An Anthology of Chicana Literature. Tey Diana Rebolledo and Eliana S. Rivero. Tucson: University of Arizona Press, c1993.
"Facing the Mariachis." Latina Women's Voices from the Borderlands. Ed.Lillian Castillo-Speed. New York: Simon and Schuster, c1995. 37-49.
The Mystery of Survival and Other Stories (Bilingual Press 1993)
"The Last Rite." Mirrors Beneath the Earth: Short Fiction by Chicano Writers. Ed. Ray Gonzalez. Willimantic, CT: Curbstone Press; East Haven, CT: Distributed by InBook, 1992. 312-321.
"Beggar on the Cordoba Bridge," collection of poems in Three Times A Woman: Chicana Poetry (Bilingual Press, 1989)

Critical studies 
Allatson, Paul. Book review of Sor Juana’s Second Dream. In Aztlán: A Journal of Chicano Studies 26.2 (Fall 2001): pp. 231–37.
Allatson, Paul. “A Shadowy Sequence: Chicana Textual/Sexual Reinventions of Sor Juana.” Chasqui: Revista de Literatura Latinoamericana 33.1 (May 2004): pp. 3–27.
Chávez-Silverman, Susana. “Alicia Gaspar de Alba.” The Oxford Encyclopedia of Latinos and Latinas in the United States. Eds. Suzanne Oboler and Deena J. González. New York and Oxford: Oxford University Press, 2005. Vol. 2: pp. 185–86.
Marchino, Lois A. The Oxford Companion to Women's Writing in the United States, edited by Cathy N. Davidson and Linda Wagner-Martin. New York: Oxford University Press, 1995.
Vivancos Perez, Ricardo F. Los discursos sobre sexualidad en la obra de Alicia Gaspar de Alba. Dissertation: Thesis (M.A. )--Texas A & M University, 2002.
 Vivancos Perez, Ricardo F.  Radical Chicana Poetics. London and New York: Palgrave Macmillan, 2013.

References

Further reading

External links 
Biography from the Cesar Chavez Department at UCLA
Gaspar de Alba's website
Desert Blood site
Gaspar de Alba's blog

Lambda Literary Award winners
LGBT Hispanic and Latino American people
Living people
American academics of Mexican descent
American writers of Mexican descent
University of Texas at El Paso alumni
University of New Mexico alumni
University of California, Los Angeles faculty
American women poets
American LGBT poets
1958 births
Lesbian academics
American lesbian writers
21st-century American LGBT people
21st-century American women writers